Chromodoris orientalis is a species of colourful sea slug, a dorid nudibranch, a marine gastropod mollusc in the family Chromodorididae. Sea slugs are generally very beautifully colored organisms with intense patterns and ranging in sizes. The Chromodoris orientalis specifically is a white sea slug with black spots in no particular pattern with a yellow, orange, or brown in color ring around its whole body and on its gills. There is much discussion on where it is found, what it eats, how it defends itself without a shell, and its reproduction methods. This is all sought after information because there is not much known about these animals.

Distribution
This species has been reported from Japan, Hong Kong and Korea.

Japan 
It is commonly found in the Sagami Bay and on the Echizen Coast of Japan.

Taiwan 
The Chromodoris orientalis are more common in Japan, but have been seen in Taiwan and recorded in March and April 1983, by Bernard Picton.

Hong Kong 
The Chromodoris orientalis was spotted and recorded in Hong Kong in October 2000, by Leslie Chan.

Description
Chromodoris orientalis is translucent white with oval black spots on the mantle. The edge of the mantle has a narrow orange border and the rhinophore clubs and outer gill surfaces are orange. The rhinophores are scent and taste receptors that protrude on the front of the sea slug, the gills protrude on the opposite end from the rhinophores. They, like other sea slugs, also have a foot which is their main source of locomotion, they use this muscular foot to crawl around on different surfaces in the ocean. Their mantle is thick and covers their foot and is used as a protection, as it secretes its toxins for chemical defense. It is unsure the exact size and weight these animals can grow to be.

Diet 
Chromodoris orientalis have various feeding methods and are generally carnivorous. They feed on sponges, hydroids, bryozoans, entoprocts, and ascidians. They use their lack of shell to be able to change size and shape in order to fit into a higher multitude of places to prey on their food.

Defense 
Sea slugs are very different than terrestrial slugs, but one similarity they do have is their lack of shell. it is thought that they both have a lack of shell due to their evolution of other, maybe more effective, defense mechanisms. It is thought that they also lack their shells because it enables them to better camouflage themselves, it allows them to change shape easier and fit into a multitude of more hiding places, or places that they can prey on their food. Nudibranch have a very well executed chemical defense that they use which is stored and then excreted by the mantle when they are feeling attacked or in distress.

Reproduction 

Chromodoris orientalis lay eggs in "egg ribbons" that are attached along one edge. These "egg ribbons" are generally on algae, but not impossible to be laid on rocks or other surfaces. There have been minimal studies on these eggs being laid other places besides algae. They reproduce sexually. Egg size was studied among them and three others in the Chromodoris genus, and it was found that eggs size varied among species but did not change within species depending on the parental body length. The number of egg whorls also varied depending on the species. They are simultaneous hermaphrodites (as are all animals in the order Nudibranchia), meaning they possess both male and female reproductive organ at the same time. Because they are simultaneous hermaphrodites, when they mate they dart their penises at one another and the first to penetrate becomes the dominant male. Their life cycle consists of eggs laid in whorls, they then hatch to become vestigial veliger larvae until they grow into adults.

References 

 

Chromodorididae
Gastropods described in 1983